Samuel Ian Russell (born 4 October 1982) is an English football coach and former professional footballer. 

As a player he was a goalkeeper from 2000 until 2021. He began his career in the Premier League with Middlesbrough although he failed to make a first team appearance but would notably go on to have three spells with Darlington between 2002 and 2012. He also played for Gateshead, Scunthorpe United, Rochdale, Wrexham and Forest Green Rovers before joining Grimsby in 2018 where he combined playing duties as James McKeown's number two with coaching the clubs goalkeepers.

Playing career

Middlesbrough
Russell was born in Middlesbrough, North Yorkshire and signed as a professional on 7 July 2000 for his hometown team after progressing through their youth system. He had a successful loan spell at Gateshead during the tail end of the 2001–02 season, followed by a brief period at Darlington on loan in 2002 after Mick Tait brought him in during a keeping crisis. He played in only one game, a 1–1 draw against Torquay United.

In August 2003 he was sent to Scunthorpe United on loan where he stayed for three months and made 10 appearances. He finally left Middlesbrough in the summer of 2004, moving to Darlington on a permanent basis. He never appeared in Middlesbrough's first team.

Darlington
He was brought to Darlington by David Hodgson in August 2004. With the retirement of goalkeeping legend Andy Collett, the club only had two goalkeepers on their books in Michael Price and youth team player Jack Norton. Russell was a target for Hodgson after he heard that Middlesbrough were releasing the youngster. Initially it was thought Russell would be number two to Price, but performances during pre-season meant that Russell got the nod. Assistant manager Mark Proctor said that both Price and Russell were of virtual equal quality but Russsell's distribution was slightly better.

In the opening game of the 2004–05 season Russell made his mark with a superb performance which earned him the man of the match. His superb saves kept Darlington in the game and meant Darlington hung on to an opening day victory. He was ever-present in the first team in the 2004–05 season, and signed a new two-year contract in July 2005.

He seemed to have established himself as the number one until just before the start of the 2007–08 season until failed to agree terms with then manager Dave Penny and Russell left to go to Rochdale and left Darlington in June 2007 after three years in which he made 107 league appearances.

Rochdale
In July 2007 he signed for Rochdale, making his first start for the club in the Football League Trophy second round tie against Bury in October 2007. Following an injury to regular keeper James Spencer, Russell was next called upon in the FA Cup defeat at Southend United. He retained his place in the side and in December 2007, signed a contract until the end of the season having been on non-contract terms. He broke a finger in the 2–1 defeat at Lincoln City in February 2008 and was expected to be out of action until April.

In the 2008–09 season Russell was handed the number one shirt for Rochdale. He had made some important saves for Rochdale that season, however he made the occasional mistake, such as scoring an own goal in the Rochdale–Bury derby, and slipping in a late equaliser by Jamie Ward against Chesterfield despite a Tom Kennedy late winner. In February he was replaced by Blackburn loanee Frank Fielding after Spencer was loaned out to Chester City.

Wrexham
After being released by Rochdale at the end of the season, Russell signed for Conference National side Wrexham after impressing on trial.

Return to Darlington
In May 2010 he agreed to rejoin Darlington on a one-year contract. He became their regular goalkeeper, and played at Wembley as they beat Mansfield Town to win the FA Trophy. He signed a one-year contract extension, but when the club suffered financial difficulties and failed to pay the players, he submitted his 14-day notice at the end of December and left the club for fellow Conference club Forest Green Rovers in January 2012.

Forest Green Rovers
Russell made his Forest Green debut on 21 January 2012 in a 0–0 draw against Newport County. In his first eight Forest Green performances he saved four consecutive penalty kicks. He made his hundredth league appearance for the club in a 2–1 win over Grimsby Town on 18 March 2014. In March 2014, he signed a contract extension to remain with the club.

A run of 144 consecutive league appearances for Forest Green was brought to an end on 21 February 2015 when he was replaced by Steve Arnold for a 3–0 win over AFC Telford United. On 4 May 2015, it was announced that he was leaving Forest Green after his contract had come to an end.

Gateshead
In June 2015, Russell joined National League side Gateshead, returning to a club where over a decade earlier he had spent time on loan.

Return to Forest Green Rovers
On 1 July 2016, it was announced that Russell had returned to former club Forest Green Rovers on a two-year deal. He made his 150th league appearance for the club in a 4–1 away win over Maidstone United on 27 August 2016. Between 17 September 2016 and 29 October 2016, he kept a run of seven National League clean sheets, until Oliver Hawkins header in a 1–1 draw with Dagenham & Redbridge saw him concede and narrowly miss out on the league record of eight consecutive clean sheets set by Alan Julian for Stevenage.

Russell appeared in every single of minute of Forest Green's 2016-17 campaign, as he helped the club secure promotion to the Football League for the first time in their history with a 3-1 National League play-off final win against Tranmere Rovers at Wembley Stadium. He was rewarded with a new one-year contract in June 2017 for Forest Green's first season in League Two.

He was released by Forest Green at the end of the 2017–18 season.

Coaching career

Grimsby Town
On 9 July 2018 he joined Grimsby Town as the club's new player / goalkeeper coach.

Russell retired from playing at the end of the 2020–21 season but remained Paul Hurst's first team goalkeeping coach. On 25 June 2022, Russell announced via his Twitter account that he was leaving Grimsby.

Career statistics

Honours
Darlington

FA Trophy: 2010–11

References

External links

1982 births
Living people
Footballers from Middlesbrough
English footballers
Association football goalkeepers
English Football League players
National League (English football) players
Northern Premier League players
Middlesbrough F.C. players
Gateshead F.C. players
Darlington F.C. players
Scunthorpe United F.C. players
Rochdale A.F.C. players
Wrexham A.F.C. players
Forest Green Rovers F.C. players
Grimsby Town F.C. players
Grimsby Town F.C. non-playing staff